The Jaako (Yaako) were an indigenous Australian people of the Northern Territory.

Name
The Jaako were one of the 4 tribes in Arnhem Land that employed their word for 'no' as the basis for their endonym.

Language
The language spoken on Croker Island, Jaako territory, was called Marrku.

Country
They also held land on the area on the Cobourg Peninsula on the mainland opposite, and were also present at Raffles Bay.

People
The early explorer G. Windsor Earl stated that the Jaako appeared to be formed from the 'amalgamation'  of two distinct tribes. Earl claimed on the one hand that they were a disagreeable people, who blindly followed their chieftains, and engaged in theft, but on the other hand that they treated with generous hospitality Earl's party when they visited the Jaako on Croker Island. Earl states that:
'The people of this tribe are generally small in stature, ill-formed and their countenances are forbidding and disagreeable. The hair is generally coarse and bushy. The beards and whiskers of the men are thick and curly, while the entire body is often covered with short crisp hair, which about the breast and shoulders is sometimes so thick as to conceal the skin. The eyes are small, and what should be the white has a dull muddly appearance.'

Their leader at the time was, again according to Earl, a certain Mimaloo, whom together with another warrior, Loka, later killed by the Makassans in revenge for the death of one of their own, was regarded as highly aggressive.

Alternative names
 Ajokoot
 Margu (name for their language)
 Marlgu
 Marrgu, Ma:go, Margo. (toponym for Croker Island)
 Terutong
 Yaako (ja:ko means 'no')

Source:

Notes

Citations

Sources

Aboriginal peoples of the Northern Territory